Daniel Åhsberg (born 14 April 1985) is a Swedish professional ice hockey player who is currently a free agent. He previously played for Helsingborgs HC in the Swedish Hockeyettan.

In Sweden's top tier league Elitserien (SEL), Åhsberg has played for Frölunda HC and most recently for Växjö Lakers Hockey. Still awaiting his first point after twelve SEL games, he left the Lakers on 28 November 2011 and signed a one-season contract with Örebro HK of the Swedish HockeyAllsvenskan (Swe-1).

On 20 May 2016 Åhsberg signed for Scottish club Braehead Clan, of the Elite Ice Hockey League. After a season in the UK, Åhsberg returned to Sweden to sign for Helsingborgs HC.

References

External links

1985 births
Braehead Clan players
Ducs de Dijon players
Frölunda HC players
Lillehammer IK players
Living people
Örebro HK players
IK Oskarshamn players
Rögle BK players
Swedish expatriate ice hockey people
Swedish expatriate sportspeople in Norway
Swedish ice hockey left wingers
Tingsryds AIF players
Växjö Lakers players
Swedish expatriate sportspeople in Scotland
Expatriate ice hockey players in Scotland
Expatriate ice hockey players in Norway
Swedish expatriate sportspeople in France
Expatriate ice hockey players in France